Herbert Neville Stuart (March 30, 1899 —  he was buried January 12, 1981) was a Canadian professional ice hockey goaltender who played from 1919 to 1936 in various professional and amateur leagues. While Stuart primarily played in the minor International Hockey League, he played 3 games in the National Hockey League during the 1926–27 season for the Detroit Cougars, and two seasons with the Edmonton Eskimos of the Western Canada Hockey League between 1924 and 1926. He was born in Brantford, Ontario.

Career statistics

Regular season and playoffs

External links

1899 births
1981 deaths
Canadian ice hockey goaltenders
Detroit Cougars players
Detroit Olympics (CPHL) players
Detroit Olympics (IHL) players
Edmonton Eskimos (ice hockey) players
Ice hockey people from Ontario
London Tecumsehs players
Sportspeople from Brantford
Syracuse Stars (IHL) players